The Barracks was a military installation in Kingston upon Thames.

History
The barracks were built on agricultural land between 1874 and 1875. Their creation took place as part of the Cardwell Reforms which encouraged the localisation of British military forces. The barracks became the depot for the 31st (Huntingdonshire) Regiment of Foot and the 70th (Surrey) Regiment of Foot. Following the Childers Reforms, the 31st and 70th regiments amalgamated to form the East Surrey Regiment with its depot in the barracks in 1881.

Many recruits enlisted at the barracks at the start of the First World War in August 1914. A Regimental Museum was opened in 1928.

The East Surrey Regiment remained at the barracks until they amalgamated with Queen's Royal Regiment (West Surrey) to form the Queen's Royal Surrey Regiment in 1959 and the barracks were largely demolished in 1962 although the keep was retained. In 2011 a developer submitted proposals to convert the keep into flats.

References

Installations of the British Army
Barracks in London
Former buildings and structures in the Royal Borough of Kingston upon Thames
Military history of London
Military installations established in 1875
Military installations closed in 1959